The 2010 Preakness Stakes was the 135th running of the Preakness Stakes thoroughbred horse race. The race took place on May 15, 2010, and was televised in the United States on the NBC television network. Lookin At Lucky, who was jockeyed by Martin Garcia, won the race. Approximate post time was 6:18 p.m. eastern time. The Maryland Jockey Club reported total attendance of 96,760; this is recorded as second highest on the list of American thoroughbred racing top attended events for North America in 2010.

Payout 

 $2 exacta: (7-11) paid $188.00
 $1 trifecta: (7-11-6) paid $1,385.50
 $1 superfecta: (7–11–6–5) paid $17,126.00

Full chart 

 Winning breeder: Gulf Coast Farms; (FL)
 Final time – 1:55:47
 Track condition – Fast
 Attendance - 96,760

See also 

 2010 Kentucky Derby
 2010 Belmont Stakes

References

External links 

 

2010
2010 in horse racing
Horse races in Maryland
2010 in American sports
2010 in sports in Maryland